The Latvian men's national ice hockey team represents Latvia in international ice hockey. The team is ranked 10th in the world by IIHF as of 2019. The team is controlled by the Latvian Ice Hockey Federation. Their best ever finish at the World Championships was 7th place in 1997, 2004 and 2009. At the 2018 World Championship the team finished 8th. Latvia reached the quarterfinals at the 2014 Winter Olympics, losing 2–1 to Canada. Latvia has 7,145 registered players (0.36% of its population).

Overview

Tournament record

Olympic Games

World Championship

1 On Friday, 27 May the IIHF congress is scheduled to confirm Finland and Latvia as hosts.

European Championship

Team

Current roster
Roster for the 2022 IIHF World Championship.

Head coach: Harijs Vītoliņš

Retired numbers
 1 – Artūrs Irbe
 7 – Kārlis Skrastiņš
 19 – Helmuts Balderis
 33 – Sergejs Žoltoks

Coaching history

Uniform evolution

References

External links

IIHF profile
National Teams of Ice Hockey

 
Ice hockey teams in Latvia
National ice hockey teams in Europe